The following is a list of film and television appearances by American singer Jo Stafford. Although primarily a singer, Stafford made many film and television appearances throughout her career. Her filmography includes both guest spots and acting roles, spanning the decades from the 1930s when she appeared with her sisters in films such as Avenging Waters (1936) and Alexander's Ragtime Band (1938) through to her final appearance in the Frank Sinatra tribute Sinatra 75: The Best Is Yet to Come in 1990. Along the way Stafford appeared in series such as What's My Line? and Shower of Stars, as well as presenting two separate series titled The Jo Stafford Show which were recorded on two opposite sides of the Atlantic, in 1954 and 1961 respectively.

As herself

Acting roles

References

Filmography
Actress filmographies
American filmographies